Tyrrell Glacier is a glacier flowing north into the head of Moraine Fjord where it joins Harker Glacier, on the north coast of South Georgia. 

In 1982, the United Kingdom Antarctic Place-Names Committee (UK-APC), in association with Harker Glacier, named the Tyrell Glacier, after George Walter Tyrrell (1883–1961). Tyrell was a senior lecturer in geology, at the University of Glasgow from 1919–48, and authored several papers on the petrology of South Georgia, the South Shetland Islands, and the Palmer Archipelago area.

See also
 List of glaciers in the Antarctic
 Glaciology

References

Glaciers of South Georgia